Sosnovsky District is an administrative and municipal district (raion), one of the twenty-seven in Chelyabinsk Oblast, Russia. It is located in the northern central part of the oblast. Its administrative center is the rural locality (a selo) of Dolgoderevenskoye. Population:  58,570 (2002 Census);  The population of Dolgoderevenskoye accounts for 12.6% of the district's total population.

References

Notes

Sources

Districts of Chelyabinsk Oblast